Reginald Whelan (26 August 1900 – 10 July 1970) was a New Zealand cricketer. He played four first-class matches for Auckland in 1922/23.

See also
 List of Auckland representative cricketers

References

External links
 

1900 births
1970 deaths
New Zealand cricketers
Auckland cricketers
Cricketers from Auckland